This is a list of environmental degrees, including for such Various disciplinary fields as environmental science, environmental studies, environmental engineering, environmental planning, environmental policy, landscape architecture, sustainability science and studies, etc., at both undergraduate and graduate levels.

Bachelors

Bachelor of Arts
 Bachelor of Arts in Environmental Studies

Bachelor of Science
 Bachelor of Science in Environmental and Sustainability Studies
 Bachelor of Science in Environmental Engineering
 Bachelor of Science in Environmental Science(s)
 Bachelor of Science in Environmental Science and Policy
 Bachelor of Science in Environmental Studies
 Bachelor of Science in Landscape Architecture (BSLA)
 Bachelor of Science in Sustainability

Other
 Bachelor of Environmental Design (BEnvD)
 Bachelor of Environmental Science (BEnvSc)
 Bachelor of Environmental Studies (BES)
 Bachelor of Landscape Architecture (BLA)
 Bachelor of Resource and Environmental Planning (BREP)

Masters

Master of Arts
 Master of Arts in Environmental Policy
 Master of Arts in Environmental Studies
 Master of Arts in Geography and Environmental Planning
 Master of Arts in International Environmental Policy
 Master of Arts in Sustainability Studies
 Master of Arts in Urban and Environmental Policy and Planning
Master of Education 
 Master of Education in Environmental Education

Master of Professional Studies
 Master of Professional Studies in Environmental Science
 Master of Professional Studies in Environmental Studies

Master of Public Administration
 Master of Public Administration in Environmental Policy
 Master of Public Administration in Environmental Science
 Master of Public Administration in Environmental Science & Policy

Master of Science
 Master of Science in Economics and Policy of Energy and the Environment
 Master of Science in Environmental Applied Science and Management
 Master of Science in Environmental Engineering
 Master of Science in Environmental Planning
 Master of Science in Environmental Planning and Management
 Master of Science in Environmental Policy
 Master of Science in Environmental Studies and Resource Management
 Master of Science in Environmental Science
 Master of Science in Environmental Sciences and Policy
 Master of Science in Environmental Sciences, Policy and Management
 Master of Science in Environmental Studies
 Master of Science in Regenerative Studies
 Master of Science in Sustainability
 Master of Science in Sustainability Science
 Master of Science in Sustainability Management
 Master of Science in Systems Ecology

Other
 Master of Environmental Management (MEM)
 Master of Environmental Planning (MEP)
 Master of Environmental Planning and Design (MEPD)
 Master of Environmental Policy (MEP)
 Master of Environmental Policy and Management (MEPM)
 Master of Environmental Science (MEnv or MEnvSc)
 Master of Environmental Science and Management (MESM)
 Master of Environment and Sustainability (MEnvSus)
 Master of Landscape Architecture (MLA)
 Master of Philosophy in Human Ecology (M.Phil)
 Master of Resource Management (MRM)
 Master of Sustainability (MSus)
 Master of Sustainable Solutions (MSuS)
 Master of Urban and Environmental Planning (MUEP)
 Professional Science Master of Environmental Policy and Management (PSM)
 Sustainable Masters in Business Administration (MBA)

Doctoral

Doctor of Philosophy
 Doctor of Philosophy in Environment and Sustainability
 Doctor of Philosophy in Environmental Applied Science and Management

 Doctor of Philosophy in Environmental Policy
 Doctor of Philosophy in Environmental Science
 Doctor of Philosophy in Environmental Science and Management
 Doctor of Philosophy in Environmental Studies

 Doctor of Philosophy in Sustainability Science
 Doctor of Philosophy in Sustainable Development

Other

 Doctor of Environmental Management (DEM)
 Doctor of Environmental Science and Engineering (DESE, or D.Env.)
 Professional doctorate in Environmental Science and Engineering (D.Env.)

See also 
 List of master's degrees
 Outline of environmental studies

 List of sustainability programs in North America

References

External links 

 "Environmental Programs Curriculum Study," National Council on Science and the Environment (NCSE)
 "Environmental Science" (definition), United States Department of Education
 "Environmental Studies" (definition), United States Department of Education
 "Sustainability-focused masters degree programs," Association for the Advancement of Sustainability in Higher Education (AASHE)

Environmental degrees
Environmental
Degree programs
Degree programs